Adolfo Facussé is a prominent Honduran businessman known for his support for the de facto government of Roberto Micheletti during the 2009 Honduran constitutional crisis. On September 12 he was refused entry to the United States and deported for this support. Until April 2013, he was president of El Consejo Hondureño de la Empresa Privada (COHEP), a body representing private businesses in Honduras, though he remained president of a similar national organization, the ''Asociación Nacional de Industriales (Andi).

References

Year of birth missing (living people)
Living people
Honduran businesspeople